Schizomicrus is a genus of snout and bark beetles in the family Brachyceridae. There is one described species in Schizomicrus, S. caecus.

References

Further reading

 
 

Brachyceridae
Articles created by Qbugbot